Kallu may refer to:
 Kallu (film), a Telugu film
 Kallu (name)
 Kallu, Iran, or Kali, a village in Dowlatabad Rural District, Zanjan Province